The Observer is the second EP by the American band The Strokes. It was released in 2003 as a free giveaway in the UK newspaper, The Observer.

The EP contains five songs, including one previously unreleased track.

Track listing 

2003 EPs
The Strokes EPs